Kammat Lake is a lake located on Vancouver Island at the head of Kammat Creek south of Cameron River.

References

Alberni Valley
Lakes of Vancouver Island
Dunsmuir Land District